Jade Amelia Thirlwall (born 26 December 1992) is a British singer-songwriter. She rose to prominence in the 2010s as a member of Little Mix, one of the world's best-selling girl groups. With Little Mix, she released six studio albums and achieved five number-one singles on the UK Singles Chart.

In addition to her solo work, Thirlwall signed a songwriter's publishing deal in 2019 with Sony/ATV Music, and shares songwriting credits for Little Mix, Twice, Billy Porter, Britney Spears, Iggy Azalea, and Nayeon. Aside from music and songwriting she is an ambassador for Stonewall, and noted for her political reviews and social activism, advocating for LGBTQ+ rights, ban against transgender conversion therapy in the UK, Black Lives Matter and her involvement with charity work which earned her the Gay Times Honour for Allyship in 2021. In 2022, she signed a solo record deal with RCA Records.

Early life 
Jade Amelia Thirlwall was born on 26 December 1992 and raised in the Laygate area of South Shields, Tyne and Wear, north-east of England, to parents Norma Badwi and James Thirlwall and has an older brother named Karl. She has Egyptian and Yemeni descent from her mother's side and English descent from her father's side. Thirlwall's grandfather Mohammed Ahmed Saleh Badwi moved to South Shields from Yemen in 1943, and worked as a firefighter in the merchant navy, and as a laborer for the docks. It was in South Shields that he met his wife Amelia, whose father was from Egypt.

Thirlwall, between the age of 8 and 10, lived close by a mosque where she attended a Muslim school every Saturday to learn how to read and write in Arabic and attended church every Sunday. In her teenage years she attended performing arts college at South Tyneside, where she studied a range of courses. Thirlwall identifies as being mixed-race, and in a 2020 article for Vogue Arabia, revealed that she is learning to embrace her Egyptian-Yemeni heritage more. In the interview, she stated that she is learning to connect more with her Arab side and its language in hopes of travelling more to the Middle East.

Career

2008–2021: Career beginnings and Little Mix
Thirlwall began her music career after auditioning for The X Factor in 2008, singing "Where Do Broken Hearts Go" by Whitney Houston, but was later eliminated at the bootcamp stage. She then returned in 2010, but missed out for a second time. Thirwall came back for a third attempt in 2011, auditioning with the song "I Want to Hold Your Hand" by the Beatles, and earned four "yes" votes and went through to bootcamp. After she failed the first bootcamp challenge Thirlwall was then placed in a three-piece group named "Orion" alongside Leigh-Anne Pinnock. Perrie Edwards and Jesy Nelson were in another group called "Faux Pas". Both groups were eliminated and called back by the judges and later formed into the four-piece group Rhythmix, and they progressed to judges' houses. They eventually reached the live shows and were mentored by Tulisa Contostavlos. On 28 October 2011, it was announced that the group named had changed to Little Mix. On 11 December 2011, Little Mix were announced as the winners, becoming the first group to do so on the British version of the show.

With Little Mix Thirlwall has released seven albums; DNA (2012), Salute (2013), Get Weird (2015), Glory Days (2016), LM5 (2018), Confetti (2020), and the Greatest Hits album Between Us (2021). In 2019, Thirlwall became an official songwriter after signing to Sony/ATV via joint venture TwentySeven. On 31 October 2019 she was a guest judge on the "Girl Group Battle Royale" episode in RuPaul's Drag Race UK. In May 2020, it was announced that she would be hosting an MTV web series, titled Served!.

In December 2020, she won the Equality Award at the Ethnicity Awards 2020 with group member, Leigh-Anne Pinnock, in recognition for their work towards racial equality in the United Kingdom. On 29 January 2021, it was announced that Thirlwall would be appearing as a contestant on the fourth series of The Great Stand Up to Cancer Bake Off, which aired on March later that year. She was announced as the winner and was crowned as the "Star Baker" of her episode. In November 2021, she appeared on NikkieTutorials YouTube channel, to promote her Beauty Bay Palette.

2021–present: Business ventures and solo career 
In November 2019, Thirlwall opened her own cocktail bar, Red Door, in South Shields, the name of which was later changed to Arbeia in February 2020. Residents praised Thirlwall for improving the town's nightlife. In March 2020, her new nightclub, Industry, launched next door to Arbeia. In June 2020, she collaborated with Skinnydip London, a British clothing brand, with the money from the face masks being donated to help struggling families in South Shields. On 10 September 2021, she was announced as the new face of the Italian sportswear brand, Ellesse and launched her "Autumn/Winter" collection the same day, in partnership with Ellesse, with exclusive products being available on ASOS and JD Sports.

On 4 October 2021, Thirlwall announced that she will be releasing her own 42-colour eyeshadow palette in collaboration with beauty products company, Beauty Bay, and it was launched on 11 October 2021. The palette is celestial-themed and was inspired by her passion for crystals, spirituality and astrology. The palette features 42 metallic and matte shades, with the names being referenced to her musical career, her hometown, and her love for crystals.
In January 2022, she is set to appear on RuPaul’s Drag Race, special UK vs The World series.

On 10 March 2022, Thirlwall signed a solo deal with RCA Records. In August 2022, Thirlwall took a break from the music industry, and plans to release her solo music in 2023. In the same month a collaboration between her and Jax Jones was teased with a date release set to be announced. As of November 2022, Thirlwall estimated net worth is 17.5 million, appearing on the Sunday Times Rich List, for the first time.

Artistry 
Thirwall's sound has been described as a combination of pop, R&B, and dance-pop with influences from other genres including tropical house, latin pop, and electronic music. She grew up listening to motown music, with her grandfather playing arabic music to her as a child. She cites Diana Ross as a music influence and has also expressed her love for Drag Culture, Drag Queens and is fan of RuPaul. In 2020, for a interview for Attitude (magazine) she added:"Doing a lot of performing arts growing up and stuff, I’ve always been surrounded by a lot of LGBTQ+ friends that have been in theatre school with me or at school. When we used to go on holiday Benidorm, one of the favourite things was when me mam used to the drag shows. Me mam’s always been into the glitz and the glamour [of drag] and her idol and my idols are Dana Ross, and all the big divas. And I think for me growing up, whenever I saw drag shows as a little girl, I associated drag queens with the big divas. It’s something that we’ve always loved".

Personal life 
Between 2016 and 2019, Thirlwall was in a relationship with Jed Elliott, a member of the English rock band The Struts. Since 2020, she has been dating British singer Jordan Stephens. The pair started dating in May 2020 and were first spotted together at a Black Trans Lives Matter rally in central London.

Thirlwall has multiple tattoos. On her spine, she has an Arabic tattoo that reads "Anyone can achieve their dreams if they’ve got the courage" as a tribute to her Egyptian and Yemeni ancestry, as well as a tattoo on her ribcage that means "queen" in Arabic. She also has tattoos located on her feet, and in 2019 revealed a henna-style design on her right foot. In 2021, she got a tattoo on her leg to commemorate the day Little Mix were formed in celebration of the group's 10 year anniversary.

Thirlwall has been open about her experiences with body image, racism, bullying, and eating disorder. As a teen, she experienced bullying and racism for her ethnicity and the loss of her grandfather contributed to her suffering with anorexia for five years. She later began her recovery and left the hospital weeks before she auditioned for The X Factor in 2011. In 2020, she was featured in a documentary titled Leigh-Anne: Race, Pop & Power, where she spoke about the times that she wanted cosmetic surgery after discovering her images were heavily edited to make her look as "white as possible" during her earlier days in Little Mix.

In 2020, she called out the media after journalists had mistaken her for Little Mix group member Leigh-Anne Pinnock. The journalist had used an image of her in an article that was focused around Thirlwall. In the interview she revealed that journalists often confuse the pair during interviews and that photographers often shout Pinnock's name at her whenever she is attending events.

Endorsements and fashion 
Thirlwall is a patron for Cancer Connections and a ambassador for Stonewall. In November 2019, Thirlwall opened her own cocktail bar, called Arbeia, in South Shields. In June 2020, she collaborated with Skinnydip London, a British clothing brand, with the money from her collection being donated to help struggling families in South Shields. In the same year she launched a second collaboration with them. In August 2020, she was announced as the Honorary President for South Shields F.C. and became a shareholder for the club in the same year.

In September 2020, she was photographed alongside  Heidi Klum, Lil Nas and Helen Christensen by fashion campaign Christian Cowan for his Spring/Summer 2021 collection. On 10 September 2021, Thirlwall was announced as the new face ambassador of the Italian sportswear brand, Ellesse "Autumn/Winter" collection. On 11 October 2021, she released her own eyeshadow palette in collaboration with Beauty Bay. She has also graced the cover for Interview (magazine), Vogue Arabia, and Gay Times Magazine, which won cover of the year at the PPA Awards in 2022.

Activism
Thirlwall is known for advocating on a number of issues, including Black Lives Matter, LGBTQ+ rights, Trans rights, and other social issues including her involvement with charity work. In May 2014, she donated a haul of clothes, with all of the proceedings going to the homeless. In 2017 she donated another collection of her clothes to help raise money for Cancer Connections. In the same year she helped raised money for Stonewall at her drag-themed 25th birthday party. In May 2018, she spoke at the Stonewall Youth Awards about what it meant to be an ally and encouraged more artists to do the same. In 2018 she became an LGBTQ+ rights ambassador for Stonewall and in August 2018 attended the Manchester Pride, with LGBT charity Stonewall, and 50 young LGBT people at the front of the parade.

In 2019, alongside Michelle Visage, raised £10,000 for the Mermaids UK. That same year, together with band member Leigh-Anne Pinnock, and other British celebrities, they climbed Mount Kilimanjaro to raise funds for Comic Relief's Red Nose Day. In December 2019, she spent her birthday raising money for cancer connected charities which has become a yearly tradition for her. In 2020, she attended a march with Stonewall during Manchester Pride and took to social media to call out someone who questioned the importance of pride month.

In June 2020, she attended the Black Lives Matter protest in the United Kingdom, that surfaced due to the death of an African-American man George Floyd. In the same year she attended the Black Trans Lives Matter march in London. In July 2020, she called out the brand L'Oréal, for not supporting the black trans community after their treatment towards model Munroe Bergdorf. In March 2021 she then partnered up with UNICEF to learn more about the war in Yemen.

In July 2020, she signed an open letter to the UK Equalities minister Liz Truss calling for a ban on all forms of LGBT+ conversion therapy. In 2022, she wrote an open letter for the Gay Times, Sink The Pink book in which she spoke about her experiences of being bullied and how she learned to use the "insults as fuel."

In November 2021, Thirlwall was awarded the GAY TIMES, Honour for Allyship and was featured on the cover of GAY TIMES Magazine. In an interview with the latter, she spoke of her commitment to being an LGBTQ+ ally, saying: "I think the more that I learn about my allyship and what I can be doing and how I should be doing those things, the more passionate I’ve become in using my voice and using it in the right way". In 2022, she teamed up with a renowned designer to create a limited edition community shirt for a North East football club, for all donations to be donated to charity Cancer Connections. In the same year, Thirlwall attended the Not Safe To Be Me protest at Downing Street to ban transgender conversion therapy in the UK, following the government's reversal on the issue.

Discography

Songwriting credits

Filmography

Awards and nominations

Listicles

References

1992 births
21st-century English women singers
English women pop singers
English women songwriters
English people of Egyptian descent
English people of Yemeni descent
English people of Greek descent
Feminist musicians
Labour Party (UK) people
English LGBT rights activists
Little Mix members
Living people
Musicians from Tyne and Wear
People from South Shields